Sault Ste. Marie is a federal electoral district in Ontario, Canada, that has been represented in the House of Commons of Canada since 1968.

This riding is centred on the city of Sault Ste. Marie. It includes the adjacent communities of Rankin Location 15D, Garden River 14 and Prince, and covers a portion of Unorganized North Algoma District north to the Montreal River (including the communities of Goulais Bay 15A and Obadjiwan 15E).

Electoral district

The riding was created in 1966 from parts of Algoma West riding. For most of its history, the riding included only the city of Sault Ste. Marie and some immediately surrounding communities.

It consisted initially of the City of Sault Ste. Marie and the Township of Prince. In 1976, it was redefined to consist of the part of the City of Sault Ste. Marie east of Allen's Side Road and south of the Second Line.

In 1987, it was redefined to consist of the part of the City of Sault Ste. Marie lying south of Third Line and the part of Rankin Location 15D lying within the city limits.

In 1996, it was redefined to consist of the City of Sault Ste. Marie.

In 2003, the geographic boundaries of this riding were expanded and defined as:
 "Consisting of that part of the Territorial District of Algoma lying westerly and southerly of a line described as follows: commencing at the intersection of the international boundary between Canada and the United States with the southeast corner of the Township of Plummer Additional; thence northerly and westerly along the easterly and northerly limits of said township to the southwest corner of the geographic Township of Galbraith; thence northerly along the westerly boundary of the geographic townships of Galbraith, Morin, Kane, Hurlburt, Jollineau, Menard, Pine, Hoffman and Butcher to the southerly limit of the Territorial District of Sudbury; thence westerly and northerly along the southerly and westerly limits of said territorial district to the Montreal River; thence generally westerly along said river to the northerly boundary of the geographic Township of Home; thence westerly along the northerly boundary of the geographic townships of Home and Peever to the northern shore of Lake Superior; thence S 45°00' W to the international boundary between Canada and the United States of America."

Current boundaries

In the 2012 federal electoral redistribution, this riding was redefined, losing St. Joseph Island, Macdonald, Meredith and Aberdeen Additional, Laird, Tarbutt, Johnson, Plummer Additional, Bruce Mines and a portion of Unorganized North Algoma to Algoma—Manitoulin—Kapuskasing. It is now defined as:
 "Consisting of that part of the Territorial District of Algoma described as follows: commencing at the intersection of the international boundary between Canada and the United States of America with the southeasterly corner of the Territorial District of Thunder Bay; thence N45°00'E in a straight line to the intersection of the northern shoreline of Lake Superior with the northerly boundary of the geographic Township of Peever; thence easterly along the northerly boundary of the geographic townships of Peever and Home to the Montreal River; thence generally easterly along said river to the easterly limit of the Territorial District of Algoma; thence southerly and easterly along the limit of said territorial district to the easterly boundary of the geographic Township of Bracci; thence southerly along said boundary and the easterly boundary of the geographic townships of Gaudry, Nahwegezhic, Lamming, Hughes, Curtis, Gillmor and McMahon to the northerly boundary of the geographic Township of Aberdeen; thence westerly along said boundary to the northerly limit of the Township of MacDonald, Meredith and Aberdeen Additional; thence generally westerly along said limit to the international boundary between Canada and the United States of America; thence generally westerly and northwesterly along said boundary to the point of commencement."

Members of Parliament

This riding has elected the following Members of Parliament:

Election results

Sault Ste. Marie, 2013 Representation Order

Sault Ste. Marie, 2003 Representation Order

Sault Ste. Marie, previous elections

* Changes for the Canadian Alliance are from the Reform votes in 1997.

See also
 List of Canadian federal electoral districts
 Past Canadian electoral districts

References

 Sault Ste. Marie riding from Elections Canada
1966-1987 Riding history from the Library of Parliament
1987-2008 Riding history from the Library of Parliament
 2011 results from Elections Canada
 Campaign expense data from Elections Canada
 StatsCan District Profile

Notes

External links
 Politwitter
 Project Democracy
 Pundit's Guide

Ontario federal electoral districts
Politics of Sault Ste. Marie, Ontario